The ZIL-4112 is a luxury car with a limousine body type built by ZIL of Russia.

History 
The vehicle was dubbed "Limo Number One" and was specifically designed and built for the President of Russia as head of state and took six years to complete. The ZIL-4112R has six doors and a 7.7 litre (470 ci) engine and includes calf-leather upholstery as well a video screens to show the exterior even if the windows are covered.

A new model called the ZIL-4112R, with the letter R — the first letter of the surname of Sergey Rozhkov — founder of "Depo-ZIL", who died in 2011. Due to his significant contributions to the design of the vehicle, his name is dedicated in the model name. Rozhkov and Sergey Sokolov are the founders of ZAO "Depo-Zyl"; CEO of the company is currently listed his widow Tatiana Rozhkova.

The ZIL-4112R was produced by MSC 6, which became an independent company "MSTS6 ZIL" that rents space from AMO-ZiL and continues to carry out repair and restoration of ZiL passenger cars and assembles new ZIL-4112R limousines.

Design and specifications 
This six-door limousine is powered by a 7.7-liter fuel-injection gasoline engine connected to a 6-speed automatic 
transmission.
It outputs 400 hp (298 kW).

Armour-plating will be added once the prototype gets final approval from the Kremlin administration.

Features 
The ZIL-4112R features dual-zone climate control. To prevent the two zones of air mixing with each other, an "air wall" separates the two.

References 

4112R
Luxury vehicles
Flagship vehicles
Limousines
Soviet automobiles
Cars of Russia
Russian presidential state cars
Cars introduced in 2006
2010s cars